Mirka is a Finnish or Slavic feminine given name, and a surname. It can also be a diminutive of given names such as Miroslava or Mirosław

Notable people with the name include:

Given name 
Mirka Cabrera (born 1994), Ecuadorian model
Mirka Federer (Miroslava Vavrinec, born 1978), Slovak-born Swiss tennis player
Mirka Francia (born 1975), Cuban-Italian volleyball player
Mirka Grujić (1869–1940), Serbian nurse
Mirka Koželuhová (born 1951), Czech tennis player
Mirka Miller (1949–1916), Czech-Australian mathematician and computer scientist, university professor
Mirka Mora (1928–2018), French-born Australian visual artist
Mirka Rantanen, Finnish musician
Mirka Soinikoski (born 1975), Finnish politician
Mirka Vasiljević (born 1990), Serbian actress
Mirka Velinovska (born 1952), Macedonian journalist
Mirka Yemendzakis (died 2013), Greek actress, musician and voice coach

Surname 
 Vladimír Mirka (born 1928), Czech football coach

Finnish feminine given names